Heinrich Schrader may refer to:

Heinrich Schrader (botanist) (1767–1836), German botanist
Heinrich Schrader (fencer) (1878–?), German Olympic fencer
Heinrich Schrader (sportsman) (1893–1980), Australian VFL footballer and cricketer